Philippa of Antioch (11481178), was Lady of Toron by her marriage to Humphrey II of Toron and a mistress of Andronikos I Komnenos.

Early life and family 
Philippa was the younger daughter of Constance, Princess of Antioch and her first husband Raymond of Poitiers. Philippa's siblings were Bohemond III of Antioch and Maria of Antioch, who married Manuel I Komnenos. In 1149, her father died in the Battle of Inab, and her mother remarried in 1153 to Raynald of Châtillon. From this marriage at least one daughter was born, Agnes who married Bela III of Hungary.

Court
Philippa encountered Andronikos I Komnenos at the court of the Principality of Antioch. Captivated by him, she was seduced and was his mistress from 1166–1167.

After she was abandoned by Andronikos, Philippa married Humphrey II of Toron. She and Humphrey however, had no children. Philippa died in 1178 around aged thirty. She was buried at the church of St. Mary in the Valley of Josaphat.

References

Sources

Mistresses of Byzantine royalty
Women of the Crusader states
1148 births
1178 deaths